The Chinese elm cultivar Ulmus parvifolia 'The Thinker' was selected by M. Hayman from a tree on the campus of the University of Louisville, Kentucky.

Description
The tree is noted for its rounded habit and exfoliating bark.

Pests and diseases
The species and its cultivars are highly resistant, but not immune, to Dutch elm disease, and unaffected by the Elm Leaf Beetle Xanthogaleruca luteola.

Cultivation
'The Thinker' is not known to be in cultivation beyond North America.

Etymology
The tree was named for its proximity on campus to the copy of the eponymous statue by Auguste Rodin.

Accessions
None known.

References

Chinese elm cultivar
Ulmus articles missing images
Ulmus